Belcherville is a city along U.S. Route 82 and Farm to Market Road 1816 in Montague County, Texas, United States. The population is less than 50.

History
The settlement was first called Belcher after local ranchers of the same name, though the settlement was really nothing more than the headquarters of that  ranch.  In 1887, the Gainesville, Henrietta and Western Railway was surveyed through Montague County, Texas, generally north of modern-day U.S. Route 82.  Ranchers John and A. S. Belcher offered land for the railway's right-of-way, and the community of Belcherville was born.  A post office opened in 1887. Belcherville continued to grow for the next 5 years, claiming 1,200 residents and 51 businesses at the 1900 census.  Among those claimed were five dry goods, two millinery shops, two of the largest hardware stores in Montague county, one of the west's most complete furniture stores, one bank, two drug stores, two mills and gins, a music store, one weekly newspaper, one large lumber yard, three blacksmith shops, and two beautiful churches.  Belcherville was incorporated in 1891 and shortly afterward it became the largest town in Montague County. By this time it had a mayor and city council.

Soon after its incorporation, the community began to decline.  The catalyst for the decline was a dispute with the Rock Island Railroad over payment for a proposed local crossing (the Katy crossing).  The railroad refused to pay, and routed the railway through Ringgold, Texas and away from Belcherville, triggering the beginning of an exodus from the city. But the biggest blow to the city occurred in 1893 on February 6 and 7, when most of the city's business district burned down.  The cause of the fire is unknown, although it's generally attributed to arson.

Belcherville received national publicity in 1948 when the post office burned and Postmaster John Reeves carried on his postal services in his automobile. The unusual incident was reported and pictured in the late Bob Ripley's Believe It or Not!  Belcherville also lays claim to some part of the early life of the late Amon G. Carter, a nationally known publisher, who worked during the early 1890s in a Belcherville livery stable.

When the town voted to reincorporate is something of a mystery, but in 1958, it claimed to be the smallest incorporated city in the United States.  In 2000, the population stood at 34.

Education
The City of Belcherville is served by the Nocona Independent School District.  Some students in outlying areas may attend Gold-Burg Independent School District.

External links
Handbook of Texas Online
Nocona Chamber of Commerce
Nocona Independent School District
History of the Chisholm Trail

Cities in Texas
Cities in Montague County, Texas
Ghost towns in North Texas